Sam Burns (born 9 August 2002) is an English professional footballer who plays for Blackburn Rovers, as a striker.

Career
After playing youth football with Blackburn Rovers, Burns signed on loan for F.C. United of Manchester in October 2021, scoring two goals in six games in all competitions, before moving (again on loan) to Scunthorpe United in January 2022.

References

2002 births
Living people
English footballers
Blackburn Rovers F.C. players
F.C. United of Manchester players
Scunthorpe United F.C. players
Northern Premier League players
English Football League players
Association football forwards